Hi-Tech Park station, formerly Gaoxinyuan station, is a station on Line 1 of the Shenzhen Metro. It started operations on 28 September 2009. It is located underground at the intersection of Shennan Dadao, Tonggu Road and Kejinan Shilu, in the Nanshan District of Shenzhen, China. The station is named after the Shenzhen Hi-Tech Park, but the name has been criticized as inappropriate since it is actually closer to Dachong.

Station layout

Exits

References

External links
 Shenzhen Metro Hi-Tech Park Station (Chinese)
 Shenzhen Metro Hi-Tech Park Station (English)

Railway stations in Guangdong
Shenzhen Metro stations
Nanshan District, Shenzhen
Railway stations in China opened in 2009